About Schmidt is a 2002 American comedy-drama film co-written and directed by Alexander Payne and starring Jack Nicholson in the title role. The film also stars Hope Davis, Dermot Mulroney, and Kathy Bates. It is loosely based on the 1996 novel of the same title by Louis Begley. About Schmidt was theatrically released on December 13, 2002, by New Line Cinema. The film was both a commercial and critical success, earning $105.8 million on a $30 million budget.

Plot
Warren Schmidt is retiring from his position as an actuary with Woodmen of the World, a life insurance company in Omaha, Nebraska. After a retirement dinner, Schmidt finds it hard to adjust to his new life, feeling useless.

Warren sees a television advertisement about a foster program for African children, Plan USA, and decides to sponsor a child. He soon receives an information package with a photo of his foster child, a small Tanzanian boy named Ndugu Umbo, to whom he relates his life in a series of candid, rambling letters.

Schmidt visits his young successor at the life insurance company to offer his help, but he is politely declined. As he leaves the building, Schmidt sees the contents and files of his office, his entire career, set out for the garbage. He describes to Ndugu his longtime alienation from Helen, his wife, who dies from a blood clot in her brain just after their purchase of a Winnebago Adventurer motor home. 

Jeannie, their daughter, and her fiancé, Randall Hertzel, a waterbed salesman, arrive from Denver. Consoling him at the funeral, she later berates him for taking his wife for granted, refusing to fully pay for the Winnebago (he wanted the cheaper model) and getting her a cheap casket. He asks her to move back to take care of him, but she refuses. Meanwhile, Randall tries to rope him into a pyramid scheme.

Schmidt feels his daughter could do better than Randall. After they leave, Schmidt is overcome by loneliness. He stops showering, sleeps in front of the television, and goes shopping with a coat over pajamas to load up on frozen foods. When he discovers hidden love letters disclosing Helen's long-ago affair with Ray, a mutual friend, Schmidt collects all her possessions and dumps them unceremoniously next to a clothing donations bin. He then confronts Ray for his betrayal.

Deciding to take a journey in the new Winnebago to visit his daughter and convince her not to marry Randall, he tells her he is coming early for the wedding. She makes it clear she does not want him there until right before the ceremony, so Schmidt visits places from his past, including his college campus and fraternity at University of Kansas and his hometown in Holdrege, Nebraska. His childhood home is now a tire shop.

At a trailer campground, he is invited to dinner by a friendly and sympathetic couple. When the man goes for beer, Schmidt makes a pass at the wife, and flees in terror when she adamantly rejects him. Sitting on the roof of his RV on a starry night, Schmidt forgives his departed wife for her affair, apologizing to her for his own failings. At that moment, he is amazed to see a bright meteor streak across the sky, taking it as a possible sign from Helen.

Feeling full of purpose and energetic renewal, Schmidt arrives in Denver, where he stays at the home of Roberta, Randall's mother. He is appalled by his eccentric, odd, lower-middle-class family (compared to Schmidt's as an upper middle class corporate executive) and can't dissuade Jeannie from the marriage. Schmidt throws out his back after sleeping on Randall's waterbed, infuriating Jeannie. Roberta assures him that a soak in her hot tub will help his back, but he flees after she makes a pass at him in the tub. The next day, Schmidt, exhausted from a restless night, attends the wedding and delivers a kind speech at the reception, hiding his disapproval.

On his way home, Schmidt composes a letter to Ndugu. He questions his life accomplishments, lamenting that he will soon be dead, that his life has made no difference to anyone, and that eventually it will be as if he has never existed at all.

A pile of mail is waiting for him at home. Schmidt opens a letter from Tanzania. It is from a nun, who writes that Ndugu is six and unable to read and reply to Schmidt's letters on his own, but appreciates them and Schmidt's financial support very much. The enclosed crayon drawing, of Ndugu and Schmidt holding hands on a sunny day, moves Schmidt to tears.

Cast

Production
Payne's script to About Schmidt was initially an original screenplay written years before Begley's novel was published.  According to Payne, his script was about "an old guy who retires, and realizes how much he’s wasted his life, and wants somehow to start anew— The Graduate at age sixty-five."  Payne completed the script in 1991 and offered it to Universal Pictures, but the studio rejected it.  Following the publication of Begley's novel in 1996, Payne decided to combine his script with the plot of the novel, thus making it an adaptation.

Filming took place for two months in several Nebraska cities, including Omaha, Nebraska City, Minden, Kearney, and Lincoln. Omaha was chosen because it was where Payne grew up. At least one scene was filmed in Denver where Nicholson's character is driving in front of the famous Ogden Theater located at 935 E Colfax. Filming concluded in May 2001.

Before agreeing to the nude hot tub scene, Kathy Bates said she hashed out with director Alexander Payne exactly what part of her anatomy would be shown and what wouldn't. "I battled to make myself comfortable, and he battled to get what he wanted. We met in the middle."

Reception

Box office
In the United States, the film grossed $8,533,162 on its opening weekend. Its total U.S. box office gross stands at $65,005,217, while total worldwide gross totals $107,054,484.

Critical response 
About Schmidt drew praise from a number of critics, who singled out the performances of Jack Nicholson and Kathy Bates. Film website Rotten Tomatoes reported an approval rating of 85% based on 203 reviews, with an average rating of 7.71/10. The site's critical consensus reads, "In this funny, touching character study, Nicholson gives one of the best performances of his career." On Metacritic, the film has a weighted average score of 85 out of 100, based on 40 critics, indicating "universal acclaim". Audiences polled by CinemaScore gave the film an average grade of "B" on an A+ to F scale.

Roger Ebert gave About Schmidt three-and-a-half out of four stars and wrote the following for the Chicago Sun-Times: About Schmidt "is essentially a portrait of a man without qualities, baffled by the emotions and needs of others. That Jack Nicholson makes this man so watchable is a tribute not only to his craft, but to his legend: Jack is so unlike Schmidt that his performance generates a certain awe. Another actor might have made the character too tragic or passive or empty, but Nicholson somehow finds within Schmidt a slowly developing hunger, a desire to start living now that the time is almost gone."

Michael Rechtshaffen of The Hollywood Reporter wrote: "It's a commanding Jack Nicholson lead performance that puts it into a sublime league of its own." Paul Clinton of  CNN.com wrote: "About Schmidt is undoubtedly one of the finest films of the year. If you're not deeply touched by this movie, check your pulse."

Awards and nominations

Upon accepting his Golden Globe for Best Actor in a Drama, Nicholson stated, "I'm a little surprised. I thought we made a comedy."

It was also part of the Official Competition Selection at the 2002 Cannes Film Festival.

Home media  
About Schmidt was released on DVD and VHS on June 3, 2003. It was released on Blu-ray for the first time on February 3, 2015.

See also 
 Fictional actuaries

References

External links

 
 

2000s road comedy-drama films
American road comedy-drama films
Films about old age
Films based on American novels
Films directed by Alexander Payne
Films scored by Rolfe Kent
Films featuring a Best Drama Actor Golden Globe winning performance
Films set in Colorado
Films set in Nebraska
Films shot in Denver
Films shot in Nebraska
New Line Cinema films
Films with screenplays by Alexander Payne
Films with screenplays by Jim Taylor (writer)
Films about father–daughter relationships
American black comedy films
2000s English-language films
2000s American films